David de Paula Gallardo (born 31 May 1984) is a Spanish footballer who plays as a midfielder.

He spent his entire professional career in Austria, with Wolfsberger AC and Austria Wien. In his country, he amassed Segunda División B totals of 270 matches and 44 goals for a host of clubs.

Club career
Born in Durango, Biscay, de Paula finished his development at Athletic Bilbao after joining the club at the age of 18. His only competitive appearances for the first team occurred during the 2005 UEFA Intertoto Cup, as he started in both legs of the tie against FC Ecomax, lost after a penalty shootout.

De Paula only played lower league football in his home country, amassing Segunda División B totals of 270 matches and 44 goals for Bilbao Athletic, Alicante CF, SD Lemona, SD Ponferradina, CF Palencia, UD Logroñés and Barakaldo CF, over nine seasons. With Logroñés, he scored a career-best 11 goals in 2011–12, helping to a final fifth position.

Aged 28, de Paula moved to Austria, signing with Wolfsberger AC. His Bundesliga debut took place on 25 July 2012, when he came on as a 69th-minute substitute for compatriot Jacobo in a 0–1 home defeat to FK Austria Wien.

In the 2014 January transfer window, de Paula moved to Austria Wien.

Career statistics

References

External links

1984 births
Living people
People from Durango, Biscay
Spanish footballers
Footballers from the Basque Country (autonomous community)
Association football midfielders
Segunda División B players
Tercera División players
CD Basconia footballers
Bilbao Athletic footballers
Athletic Bilbao footballers
Alicante CF footballers
SD Lemona footballers
SD Ponferradina players
CF Palencia footballers
UD Logroñés players
Barakaldo CF footballers
Austrian Football Bundesliga players
Wolfsberger AC players
FK Austria Wien players
Spanish expatriate footballers
Expatriate footballers in Austria
Spanish expatriate sportspeople in Austria
Sportspeople from Biscay